Tavamen Shineh (also Romanized as Tavāmen Shīneh) is a village in Osmanvand Rural District, Firuzabad District, Kermanshah County, Kermanshah Province, Iran. At the 2006 census, its population was 142, in 29 families.

References 

Populated places in Kermanshah County